The Killing Season is an American true crime documentary television series which debuted on November 12, 2016, on A&E. Executive produced by Alex Gibney, the series follows documentarians Joshua Zeman and Rachel Mills as they explore the case of the Long Island serial killer and other unsolved cases such as the Eastbound Strangler, and the victims and investigations that have been connected to the cases. Some new investigating and interviewing is done during the series, including contacting internet amateur crime investigation group Websleuths.com group members, and following-up on Websleuths activities.

Series producers found sex worker serial killings to be a bigger problem than they expected and they look for obstacles that law enforcement has in solving the murders.

Production
A&E announced in September 2016 that the series would premiere on November 5, 2016, however the premiere was later delayed by one week. The theme music for the series is the 1979 recording of "Bela Lugosi's Dead" by Bauhaus.

Reception
The Killing Season has received generally positive reviews from critics. On Metacritic, it has a score of 63 out of 100 based on four reviews.

Episodes

See also
Peaches (murder victim)

References

External links
 
 

2010s American documentary television series
2016 American television series debuts
2016 American television series endings
A&E (TV network) original programming
Long Island
True crime television series